Keep On Trying may refer to:
"Keep On Tryin'", a song by Twenty 4 Seven from the album I Wanna Show You
"Keep On Trying", a song by Curiosity Killed the Cat from the album Getahead
"Keep On Trying", a song by Garland Jeffreys from the album One-Eyed Jack
"Keep On Trying", a song by Osibisa from the album Ojah Awake
"Keep On Trying", a song by Slaughter and the Dogs from the album Do It Dog Style
"Keep On Trying", a song by the Strawbs from the album Burning for You
"Keep On Trying", a song by The Outsiders (Dutch band)
"Keep On Trying", a song composed by Papa Charlie McCoy
"Keep On Trying (Sechs Freunde)", a song by British Sea Power from the album Let the Dancers Inherit the Party
Keep On Trying, an album by Emma Russack and Lachlan Denton

See also
Keep Tryin' (disambiguation)